The Defenestration of St. Martin is the debut album by former Gene lead singer Martin Rossiter, released in November 2012 through Pledge Music. The album features Rossiter accompanying himself on piano.

Track listing

Reception
The album has received widespread critical acclaim, scoring 83% on metacritic. The Guardian described it as "an unlikely but often brilliant comeback". David Quantick at the BBC noted that "Rossiter’s voice, which has developed into a mature but still dramatic thing, [is] capable of conveying powerful emotion as well as sharp observation".

Personnel
 Martin Rossiter - Vocals, Keyboards

External links

2012 debut albums